Darts is a 2003 album from the Benevento/Russo Duo. Made up of only Marco Benevento and Joe Russo, the album contains the two playing only keyboards and drums, respectively. It was recorded live at the Knitting Factory and the Tribeca Rock Club, both venues in New York City.

Track listing
"Abduction Pose" - 15:52
"Big Whopper" - 14:17
"Darts" - 11:23
"Ambiguously?" - 12:52
"Marzipan" - 18:08

Credits
Marco Benevento - organs, synthesizers, keyboards
Joe Russo - drums, percussion

2003 live albums
Benevento/Russo Duo albums